Mothers against decapentaplegic homolog 7 or SMAD7 is a protein that in humans is encoded by the SMAD7 gene.

SMAD7 is a protein that, as its name describes, is a homolog of the Drosophila gene: "Mothers against decapentaplegic". It belongs to the SMAD family of proteins, which belong to the  TGFβ superfamily of ligands. Like many other TGFβ family members, SMAD7 is involved in cell signalling. It is a TGFβ type 1 receptor antagonist. It blocks TGFβ1 and activin associating with the receptor, blocking access to SMAD2. It is an inhibitory SMAD (I-SMAD) and is enhanced by SMURF2.

Smad7 enhances muscle differentiation.

Structure 

Smad proteins contain two conserved domains. The Mad Homology domain 1 (MH1 domain) is at the N-terminal and the Mad Homology domain 2 (MH2 domain) is at the C-terminal. Between them there is a linker region which is full of regulatory sites. The  MH1 domain has DNA binding activity while the MH2 domain has transcriptional activity. The linker region contains important regulatory peptide motifs including potential phosphorylation sites for mitogen-activated protein kinases(MAPKs), Erk-family MAP kinases, the Ca2+ /calmodulin-dependent protein kinase II (CamKII) and protein kinase C (PKC). Smad7 does not have the MH1 domain. A proline-tyrosine (PY) motif presents at its linker region enables its interaction with the WW domains of the E3 ubiquitin ligase, the Smad ubiquitination-related factors (Smurf2). It resides predominantly in the nucleus at basal state and translocates to the cytoplasm upon TGF-β stimulation.

Function 

SMAD7 inhibits TGF-β signaling by preventing formation of Smad2/Smad4 complexes which initiate the TGF-β signaling. It interacts with activated TGF-β type I receptor therefore block the association, phosphorylation and activation of Smad2.  By occupying type I receptors for Activin and bone morphogenetic protein (BMP), it also plays a role in negative feedback of these pathways.

Upon TGF- β treatment, Smad7 binds to discrete regions of Pellino-1 via distinct regions of the Smad MH2 domains. The interaction blocks the formation of the IRAK1-mediated IL-1R/TLR signaling complex therefore abrogates NF-κB activity, which subsequently causes reduced expression of pro-inflammatory genes.

While Smad7 is induced by TGF-β, it is also induced by other stimuli, such as epidermal growth factor (EGF), interferon-γ and tumor necrosis factor (TNF)-α. Therefore, it provides a cross-talk between TGF-β signaling and other cellular signaling pathways.

Role in cancer 

A mutation located in SMAD7 gene is a cause of susceptibility to colorectal cancer (CRC) type 3.  Perturbation of Smad7 and suppression of  TGF-β signaling was found to be evolved in CRC.  Case control studies and meta-analysis in Asian and European populations also provided evidence that this mutation is associated with colorectal cancer risk.

TGF-β is one of the important growth factors in pancreatic cancer. By controlling the  TGF-β pathway, smad7 is believed to be related to this disease. Some previous study showed over-expression of Smad7 in pancreatic cells but there was a recent study showed a low Smad7 expression. The role of Smad7 in pancreatic cancer is still controversial.

Over-expression or constitutive activation of epidermal growth factor receptor (EGFR) can promote tumor processes. EGF-induced MMP-9 expression enhances tumor invasion and metastasis in some kinds of tumor cells such as breast cancer and ovarian cancer. Smad7 exerts an inhibitory effect on the EGF signaling pathway. Therefore, it may play a role in prevention of cancer metastasis.

Use in Pharmacology 

SMAD7 signaling has been studied in a recent Celgene Phase III trial, NCT ID number 94, which interacts with the SMAD7 pathway. This drug (Mongersen) was studied in patients with Crohn's disease.

Interactions 

Mothers against decapentaplegic homolog 7 has been shown to interact with:
 CTNNB1,
 EP300,
 TAB1,
 PIAS4,
 RNF111,
 SMAD3.
 SMAD6,
 SMURF2,
 STRAP,
 TGFBR1, and
 YAP1.

References

Further reading 

 
 
 
 
 
 
 
 
 
 

Developmental genes and proteins
MH1 domain
MH2 domain
Transcription factors
Human proteins